Mahur Berenji-ye Olya (also Romanized as Māhūr Berenjī-ye ‘Olyā; also known as Mahoor Berenjī, Māhūr, and Māhūr Berenjī-ye Bālā) is a village in Mahur Berenji Rural District, Sardasht District, Dezful County, Khuzestan Province, Iran. At the 2006 census, its population was 169, in 30 families.

References 

Populated places in Dezful County